Sóley is a feminine given name of Icelandic origin meaning buttercup. The name is also in use in the Faroe Islands. The name is a diminutive for the Faroese name Sólja, also meaning buttercup, or a combination of the Germanic name elements sol, meaning sun, and ey, meaning island.

Usage
The name was among the ten most popular names for newborn girls in Iceland in 2021. The name, spelled Soley, was given to eleven newborn girls in the United States in 2021. Variant Sólja was among the ten most popular names for newborn girls in the Faroe Islands in 2021.

People
Sóley (born 1987), Icelandic musician
Guðrún Sóley Gunnarsdóttir (born 1982), an Icelandic former football defender who was part of Iceland's national team and competed at UEFA Women's Euro 2009

Notes

Given names derived from plants or flowers
Icelandic feminine given names